A389 may refer to:

 A389 road (Great Britain)
 RFA Wave Knight (A389), a British fleet auxiliary vessel
 Airbus A380-900, a model of aircraft